represent Japanese efforts to learn from the Chinese culture and civilization in the 7th, 8th and 9th centuries.  The nature of these contacts evolved gradually from political and ceremonial acknowledgment to cultural exchanges; and the process accompanied the growing commercial ties which developed over time.

Between 607 and 838, Japan sent 19 missions to China.  Knowledge and learning was the principal objective of each expedition.  For example: Priests studied Chinese Buddhism.  Officials studied Chinese government.  Doctors studied Chinese medicine.  Painters studied Chinese painting. Approximately one third of those who embarked from Japan did not survive to return home.

See also
 Sinocentrism
 Japanese missions to Sui China
 Japanese missions to Ming China
 Japanese missions to Silla
 Japanese missions to Joseon

Notes

References
 Fogel, Joshua A. (2009). Articulating the Sinosphere: Sino-Japanese Relations in Space and Time. Cambridge: Harvard University Press.  ; 
 __. (1996). The Literature of Travel in the Japanese Rediscovery of China, 1862-1945.  Stanford: Stanford University Press. ;  OCLC 32626862
 . (1992).   in  editor, . Tokyo: Yoshikawa kōbunkan,.
 . (1966). . Tokyo: Shibundō.
 . (2003). . Tokyo: Yoshikawa kōbunkan.
 Nussbaum, Louis-Frédéric and Käthe Roth. (2005).  Japan encyclopedia. Cambridge: Harvard University Press. ;  OCLC 58053128
  (1977). . Tokyo: Tōkai University Press.
 Titsingh, Isaac. (1834).  Annales des empereurs du Japon (Nihon Odai Ichiran).  Paris: Royal Asiatic Society, Oriental Translation Fund of Great Britain and Ireland. OCLC 5850691 
 . Tokyo: Nihon hyōronsha.
  (2002). . Tokyo: Nōsan gyosen bunka kyōkai.

Ambassadors of Japan to China